Rome Catholic School is a private, tuition funded, co-education school in Rome, New York. Rome Catholic School provides education, based in Roman Catholicism, to students from pre-kindergarten through 6th grade. It is within the auspices of the Roman Catholic Diocese of Syracuse.

History
Rome Catholic is located at 800 Cypress Street in Oneida County, New York. The school replaced the Academy of Holy Names (1873-1963) and St. Aloysius Academy (1850-1963).  When Rome Catholic was established in 1963, it was a 9 through 12 high school called Rome Catholic High (RCH).  In 1986, 7th and 8th grades were added.  During the early 2000s, pre-kindergarten through sixth grade were added and the school was renamed Rome Catholic School (RCS).

Beginning in the 2013–2014 school year, RCS will be a PK-6 school.

AFRL Partners
A high school curriculum in cyber security was to be tested at Rome Catholic School starting in the spring semester of 2006. This program was affiliated with the US Air Force Research Laboratory in Rome, NY.

External links
 Official web site

Notes and references

Catholic elementary schools in New York (state)
Educational institutions established in 1963
Roman Catholic Diocese of Syracuse
Schools in Oneida County, New York
Private middle schools in New York (state)
Private elementary schools in New York (state)
Rome, New York
1963 establishments in New York (state)